PGC 54493 is a barred spiral galaxy located about 490 million light-years away in the constellation Serpens. It is part of a galaxy group called Abell 2052.  It has an estimated diameter of 140,000 light-years.

See also 
 Messier 109, another galaxy with a similar appearance in the constellation Ursa Major

References

External links 

 Simbad entry on PGC 54493

Barred spiral galaxies
Serpens (constellation)
54493
J15161917